Dixon Wecter (January 12, 1906 – June 24, 1950) was an American historian. He was "the first professor of American History" at the University of Sydney, and the Margaret Byrne Professor of United States History at the University of California, Berkeley. He was the author of three books.

Early life
Wecter was born on January 12, 1906, in Houston, Texas. He graduated from Baylor University, where he earned a bachelor's degree in 1925. He earned a master's degree from Yale University in 1926, attended the University of Oxford's Merton College as a Rhodes Scholar between 1928 and 1930, and he earned a PhD from Yale University in 1936.

Career
Wecter joined the English faculty at the University of Colorado Boulder in 1936, and he became a tenured associate professor in 1936. He was an English professor at the University of California, Los Angeles from 1939 to 1945. During those years, he was also a research fellow at the Huntington Library in 1939-1940, and a Guggenheim Fellow in 1942-1943.

Wecter became "the first professor of American history" at the University of Sydney in 1945. He was finally appointed as the Margaret Byrne Professor of United States History at the University of California, Berkeley in 1949-1950.

Wecter was the author of three books, including one about Edmund Burke.

Personal life and death
Wecter married Elizabeth Farrar in 1937.

Wecter died on June 23, 1950, in Sacramento, California.

Selected works

References

1906 births
1950 deaths
Baylor University alumni
Yale University alumni
University of Colorado Boulder faculty
University of California, Los Angeles faculty
Academic staff of the University of Sydney
University of California, Berkeley faculty
20th-century American historians
American male non-fiction writers
American Rhodes Scholars
Alumni of Merton College, Oxford
Historians from California
20th-century American male writers